Black Friday was a 1916 American silent  Feature film directed by Lloyd B. Carleton. Universal based the film on the novel written by Frederic S. Isham and adapted for the screen by Eugenie Magnus Ingleton. The  drama stars Dorothy Davenport, Emory Johnson, and a cast of Universal contract players.

The story revolves around Railroad tycoon Richard Strong. He discovers his enemies are scheming to bankrupt him. Strong enlists the help of Charles Dalton, and together they foil the plot. While working with Strong, Dalton meets Strong's wife, Elinor. Along the way, Dalton develops feelings for Elinor. Time passes, and he tries to seduce her. Elinor rejects Charles's advances and returns to Paris. Strong believes she has committed adultery but follows his wife to Paris, but they miss connections. They meet again in New York, and all ends well.

Universal released the film on September 18, 1916.

Plot

The opening scenes take place in a church. All the characters gather for the wedding of Richard Strong to Elinor Rossitor. Strong is a railroad president, known to be honest and down-to-earth. Elinor is a poor but refined visionary with dreams of wealth and status. Strong's rugged, austere nature is at odds with her warm and romantic personality, and this clash of temperaments will come back to haunt them in the future. The ceremony takes place; they wed the two, and the new couple plans a romantic honeymoon in Paris.

Rivals of Richard Strong are attempting to ruin him financially. When he leaves on his honeymoon, his enemies will carry out their scheme. They plan to issue false reports about dealings with his companies. They also plan to corner the gold market. The plan's details include bribing certain Washington officials, inducing them to send a fake telegram to President Grant. The telegram will implore the President to leave Washington to attend an event. Thus, in his absence, he cannot order the sale of gold.

One of Strong's clerks overhears part of the plan. While Strong and his wife are getting ready to leave on their honeymoon, the clerk gives him a tip about the nefarious undertakings of his rivals. Strong believes the threats are spurious and ignores the warnings. They depart for Paris.

While in Paris, more telegrams arrive, and Strong can no longer ignore the threats. He must return home. This widens the emotional chasm between Strong and his wife. After all, he is heading back to New York in the middle of their honeymoon. The couple embarks on their trip to New York. His clandestine return to New York works, and he arrives before his enemies even suspect his return.

With the help of Charles Dalton, he thwarts their plans. As a reward, Strong hires Dalton to be his assistant. While working with Strong, Dalton becomes acquainted with his wife. She becomes friendly with Dalton, and he gives her the emotional support she so desperately needs. One night, things go too far, and he tries to seduce her. She rebuffs him, and they both go their separate ways. Elinor refuses to see Dalton anymore. Dalton is craving some emotional connection and yields to the charms of his wife, Zoldene. The couple had separated when she found out he had no money.

In the meantime, Strong discovers what he thinks is the affair his wife was having with Dalton. He accuses them both of adultery. He becomes estranged from both.

Elinor decides she must escape all the intrigue at home. Along with her father, Edwin, she returns to Paris. Her father's health is fading. Strong and President Grant schedule a meeting. They met, and afterward, the President directs the Treasury to sell gold. The move shreds the last glimmers of hope for his enemies. The gold-selloff makes millions for Strong.

Edwin Rossitor's health worsens in Paris, and he wants to return to the states. Elinor wants to help him return, but she worries about the danger posed by the riots associated with the Paris Commune. Edwin wires Strong and asks him to travel to Paris to help them. When Strong arrives in France, he can find no trace of either party.

One night, as he watches a mob, he finds out Elinor is the center of the disturbance. He tries to rescue her but ends up unconscious in an alley. Later, in his hotel room, he regains his senses. Elinor is nowhere to be found.

Charles Dalton and Zoldene are also in Paris at the same time. Dalton asks Strong to pay him and his wife a visit. He swears to Strong nothing ever happened between him and his wife, Elinor. This time, Dalton convinces Strong he is telling the truth.

Strong walks away from the talk, relieved, but now believes Elinor no longer cares for him. He sadly returns to New York alone. He pays a visit to the old address and takes one last glimpse of the home to his strained marriage. As chance would have it, Elinor was also passing by the home searching for memories. They see each other, they pause, their eyes meet, and he tells her he will always love her. She looks deeper into his eyes and tells him she never stopped loving him. It rekindled their romance; they walk off hand-in-hand.

Cast

Production

Pre production

Development
According to the book - The Universal Story, Carl Laemmle (-1939) produced around 91 movies in 1916.
Lloyd B. Carleton (–1933) started working for Carl Laemmle in the Fall of 1915. Carleton arrived with impeccable credentials, having directed some 60 films for the likes of Thanhouser, Lubin, Fox, and Selig.
 
Between March and December 1916, 44-year-old Lloyd Carleton directed 16 movies for Universal, starting with The Yaqui and ending with The Morals of Hilda. Emory Johnson acted in all 16 of these films. Of Carleton's total 1916 output, 11 were feature films, and the rest were two-reel shorts.

In 1916, Carleton directed all 13 films pairing Dorothy Davenport and Emory Johnson. This film would be the tenth in the 13-film series. These totals show Carl Laemmle was clearly giving the Davenport-Johnson pairing one of his elite directors from the working cadre of universal directors to produce the screen chemistry Laemmle was seeking.

Black Friday is set during the presidency of Ulysses S. Grant. Grant was the 18th president of the United States, serving from 1869 to 1877. The movie title is based on the Black Friday scandal that initiated the gold panic of 1869. The actual date for Black Friday was Friday, September 24, 1869, when President Grant started selling Treasury gold at weekly intervals to pay off the national debt, stabilize the dollar, and boost the economy. This movie is also a period piece taking place during the Gilded Age.

Casting
All players in this film were under contract with Universal.
Dorothy Davenport (1895-1977) was an established star for Universal when the  year-old actress played the Elionor Rossitor. She had acted in hundreds of movies by the time she starred in this film. The majority of these films were 2-reel shorts, as was the norm in Hollywood's teen years. She had been making movies since 1910. She started dating Wally Reid when she was barely 16, and he was 20. They married in 1913. After her husband died in 1923, she used the name "Mrs. Wallace Reid" in the credits for any project she took part in. Besides being an actress, she would eventually become a film director, producer, and writer.
Emory Johnson (1894-1960) was   years old when he starred in this movie as Charles Dalton. In January 1916, Emory signed a contract with Universal Film Manufacturing Company. Carl Laemmle of Universal Film Manufacturing Company thought he saw great potential in Johnson, so he chooses him to be Universal's new leading man. Laemmle's hope was Johnson would become another Wallace Reed. A major part of his plan was to create a movie couple that would sizzle on the silver screen. Laemmle thought Dorothy Davenport and Emory Johnson could create the chemistry he sought. Johnson and Davenport would complete 14 films together. They started with the successful feature production of "Doctor Neighbor" in May 1916 and ended with "The Devil's Bondwoman" in November 1916. After completing the last movie, Laemmle thought Johnson did not have the screen presence he wanted. He decided not to renew his contract.  Johnson would make 17 movies in 1916, including 6 shorts and 11 feature-length Dramas. 1916 would become the second-highest movie output of his entire acting career. Emory acted in 25 films for Universal, mostly dramas with a sprinkling of comedies and westerns.
Gretchen Lederer (1891-1955) was a  year-old actress when she landed this role as Zoldene. Lederer was a German actress getting her first start in 1912 with Carl Laemmle.  At the time of this film, she was still a Universal contract actress. She had previously acted in two Bosworth-Johnson projects preceding this movie - The Yaqui and Two Men of Sandy Bar. She would unite with Emory Johnson in the 1916 productions of A Yoke of Gold and The Morals of Hilda.
Richard Morris (1862-1924) was a  year-old actor when he played Richard Strong. He was a character actor and former opera singer known for Granny (1913). He would eventually participate in many Johnson projects, including  |In the Name of the Law (1922),  The Third Alarm (1922),  The West~Bound Limited (1923), The Mailman (1923) until his untimely death in 1924.
Edith Hallor (1896–1971) was an  year-old actress when she played the part of Isabelle Hamlin.  She was an American stage and film actress and starred in several films during the silent era. She was active during 1914–1945.
Mary Maurice (1844-1918) was  year-old actress when she landed the role of Mrs. Rossitor. After a long and distinguished stage career supporting many of the same touring companies that employed Richard Morris, she appeared in 150 films between 1909 and 1918, frequently playing mothers or grandmothers.
Mark Fenton (1866–1925) was an  year-old actor when he was cast as Jim Fisk. James Fisk was an actual historical character involved in the Black Friday scandal. Fenton appeared in 80 films between 1914 and 1925 before his untimely death in Los Angeles. Fenton was also a stage performer, similar to many of the players and the Director of this film.
Wilfred Rogers (-1917) was a  actor when he played the role of Edwin Rossitor. He acted primarily in silent films and was also another speaking stage convert.

Screenplay

The story for this movie was based on the novel "Black Friday" by Frederic S. Isham (1865–1922). He was  years old when he published Black Friday and  when it was released as a film.

The storyline for the novel was rooted in the American financial crisis of 1869. The book was published in Indianapolis in 1904 and the movie was produced by arrangement with the novel's publisher, Bobbs-Merrill Company

The story was scenarioized by Mrs. E. Magnus Ingleton (-1936). She  was 
 years old when she created the screen adaption for this film. She was a British screenwriter, actress, and war correspondent.

Post production
The theatrical release of this film totaled five reels or 5,000 feet of film. As is often the case, the listed time for this feature-length movie varies. The average time per 1,000-foot 35mm reel varied between ten and fifteen minutes per reel at the time. Thus, the total time for this movie is computed between fifty and seventy-five minutes.

Studios
The interiors were filmed in the studio complex at Universal Studios located at 100 Universal City Plaza in  Universal City, California. Universal produced and distributed this film.

Release and reception

Official release
The copyright was filed with U.S. Copyright Office and entered into the record as shown:
BLACK FRIDAY. Red Feather. 1916
5 reels. From the book by Frederic S. Isham
Credits: Producer, L B. Carleton;
adaptation E. M. Ingleton
© Universal Film Mfg. Co., Inc.; 26Aug16;
LP9003

This film was officially released on September 18, 1916.

Advertising
Based on an American Film Institute standard, films with a running time of forty-five minutes or longer are considered feature films. In 1915, feature films were becoming more the trend in Hollywood.  In 1916, Universal formed a three-tier branding system for their releases. Universal films decided to label their films according to the size of their budget and status. Universal, unlike the top-tier studios, did not own any theaters to market its feature films. By branding their product, Universal gave theater owners and audiences a quick reference guide.  Branding would help theater owners make judgments for films they were about to lease and help fans decide which movies they wanted to see.

Universal released three different types of feature motion pictures:
 Red feather Photoplays – low-budget feature films
 Bluebird Photoplays – mainstream feature release and more ambitious productions
 Jewel – prestige motion pictures featuring high budgets using prominent actors

This film was the 34th release carrying the designation of Universal's "Red Feather" brand.

Reviews
The movie critic's reviews of the photoplay were mixed.

In the September 9, 1916 issue of The Moving Picture World,  movie critic Robert C. McElravy reviewed the film:

While not adequately handled in the matter of clear and consistent direction, the production maintains a strong interest and has much about it to commend. From the very first scenes, when the characters are introduced at a church wedding, one can feel the beginnings of a story of consequence, and this feeling grows as the action continues. The story as a whole has not a great deal of dramatic strength, but gets away from the beaten path and has the advantage of a pleasing historical background.

In the August 31, 1916 issue of the Wids,  the magazine reviewer states:

The story is not particularly powerful and at times is slow with the ultimate ending rather obvious, yet the novel atmosphere will help to carry it through. As a whole, this production will undoubtedly satisfy any average audience because of the unusual atmosphere of it all. It is not an exceptional film, and, in fact, it has many weak spots, but your patrons will come out and say that it was good.

Preservation status

A report created by film historian and archivist David Pierce for the Library of Congress claims:
 75% of original silent-era films have perished.
 14% of the 10,919 silent films released by major studios exist in their original 35mm or other formats.
 11% survive in full-length foreign versions or on film formats of lesser image quality. Many silent-era films did not survive for reasons as explained on this Wikipedia page.

According to the Library of Congress, all known copies of this film are lost.

Gallery

References

External links

Silent Era Black Friday

1916 lost films
1916 drama films
1916 films
American black-and-white films
1910s English-language films
Lost American films
Silent drama films
Universal Pictures films
Lost drama films
Films directed by Lloyd B. Carleton